was a Japanese jazz pianist and composer known for his unique playing style. He worked with many diverse musicians, including Sonny Rollins, Miles Davis, McCoy Tyner, Elvin Jones, Gary Peacock and Paul Motian, and collaborated with Gil Evans and Tōru Takemitsu.

Biography 
Masabumi Kikuchi was born in Tokyo in 1939. Following the firebombing of Tokyo in 1945, his family moved out of the city and settled in the rural Aizuwakamatsu, Fukushima prefecture, where his parents were born. 

He studied music at the Tokyo Art College High School. While a student, he began buying second-hand records, most likely left behind by American soldiers. His early influences were Duke Ellington, Miles Davis and Thelonious Monk. After graduating, he joined Lionel Hampton's Japanese touring band. He started a quintet with Terumasa Hino but soon after left for the US after winning a scholarship to study at Berklee College of Music. 

He died from a subdural hematoma on 6 July 2015 at a hospital in Manhasset, New York. At the time of his death, he lived in Manhattan, New York City.

Discography

As leader

As co-leader
 Gary Peacock, Hiroshi Murakami, Masabumi Kikuchi, Eastward (CBS/Sony, 1970)
 Hōzan Yamamoto + Masabumi Kikuchi – Ginkai (Philips [Japan], 1971) also with Gary Peacock and Hiroshi Murakami. recorded in 1970. reissued in 1994
 Masabumi Kikuchi, Masahiko Togashi, Gary Peacock, Poesy: The Man Who Keeps Washing His Hands (Philips [Japan], 1971)
 Gary Peacock, Hiroshi Murakami, Masahiko Togashi, Masabumi Kikuchi, Voices (Sony, 1971)
 Elvin Jones / Masabumi Kikuchi, Hollow Out (Philips [Japan], 1973) – recorded in 1972
 Masahiko Togashi + Masabumi Kikuchi, Concerto (Ninety-One, 1991) – 2CD
 Terumasa Hino, Masahiko Togashi, Masabumi Kikuchi, Triple Helix (Enja, 1993) – live
 P.M.P. (Poo Masabumi Kikuchi, Marc Johnson, Paul Motian) Miles Mode (Sony, 1993) – tribute to Miles Davis
 Masabumi Kikuchi & , Tandem (Verve, 2000)
 Masabumi Kikuchi, Ben Street, Thomas Morgan, Kresten Osgood, Kikuchi/Street/Morgan/Osgood (Ilk music, 2015) – Recorded in 2008

As a member
Kochi 
(Ensemble with Al Foster, Anthony Jackson, Dave Liebman, James Mtume, Reggie Lucas, Steve Grossman and Terumasa Hino)
Wishes= ウィッシズ (East Wind, 1976; Inner City, 1978)

AAOBB (All Night All right Off White Boogie Band)(with Conrad Adderley, Victor Jones, Aïyb Dieng, Kosuke Mine, Kelvyn Bell, Tomas Doncker, William "spaceman" Patterson)
AAOBB (Tokuma Japan, 1990)

Tethered Moon 
(Trio with Paul Motian and Gary Peacock)
First Meeting (Rec. 1990–91, Winter & Winter, 1997)
Tethered Moon (King/Paddle Wheel, 1992, Evidence, 1993)
Triangle (King/Paddle Wheel, 1992)
Plays Jimi Hendrix+ (JASRAC/Polydor, 1997)
Tethered Moon Play Kurt Weill (JMT, 1995; reissued on Winter & Winter, 2005)
Chansons d’Édith Piaf (Winter & Winter, 1999) 
Experiencing Tosca (Winter & Winter, 2004)

Slash Trio 
(Trio with Masaaki Kikuchi and Tatsuya Yoshida)
Slash 1° (PJL, 2001)
Slash 2° (PJL, 2002)
Slash 3°: Live At Motion Blue Yokohama Vol.1 (PJL, 2002)
Slash 4°: Live at Motion Blue yokohama Vol.2 (PJL, 2003)

Soundtrack album
Hairpin Circus / A Short Story For Image: Original Soundtrack (Bridge, 2006) – Movie 1972

As sideman
With Pee Wee Ellis
Blues Mission (Gramavision, 1993)

With Gil Evans
Gil Evans Live at the Royal Festival Hall London 1978 (RCA, 1979)
The Rest of Gil Evans at the Royal Festival Hall 1978 (Mole Jazz, 1981)
Live at the Public Theater (New York 1980) vol.1 (Trio, 1980)
Live at the Public Theater (New York 1980) vol.2 (Trio, 1981)

With Joe Henderson 
Joe Henderson and Kikuchi, Hino in Concert (Fontana, 1974) – Rec. 1971With Terumasa HinoHino=Kikuchi Quintet (Columbia/Takt Jazz Series, 1969) – Rec. 1968
Acoustic Boogie (Blue Note, 1995)
Moment: Alive at Blue Note Tokyo (EMI/Somethin' Else, 1996) – Live rec. 1995With Helen MerrillYou and the Night and the Music (Verve, 1998)With Paul MotianTrio 2000 + One (Winter & Winter, 1997)
Live at the Village Vanguard (Winter & Winter, 2006)
Live at the Village Vanguard Vol. II (Winter & Winter, 2006)
Live at the Village Vanguard Vol. III (Winter & Winter, 2006)With Mal Waldron'Mal: Live 4 to 1 (Philips, 1971)

Legacy in New York State Property Law

In the late 1970s, Kikuchi lived in New York City and rented a loft apartment on W. 20th Street. The large apartment, over 1700 square feet, was in a formerly commercial building adapted to artists spaces and mixed studio and apartment space. His space was filled with musical instruments and recording equipment; it contained a creative work space as well as living space. In late 1977, a health spa equipment sales business moved into the floor above Kikuchi's studio. A series of damaging water leaks, noise, and eventually large-scale building renovations began. These leaks and activities severely interfered with his work and daily living; eventually, Kikuchi sued his landlord, asserting that the combined events and activities breached the covenant of quiet enjoyment of his apartment. Importantly, he also claimed that the construction work effectively excluded his use of a generous swath of the loft apartment, that is he was constructively evicted by the landlord's acts and failure to act (related to the upstairs tenant). Despite the massive disruptions, he continued living in the apartment during the legal dispute. As per common law, an essential element of claiming constructive eviction is the tenant's moving out; the logic of the common law rule is rooted in proof: the landlord's actions must be so severe and materially impact the tenant that no one would continue to stay there under the circumstances.

The case was finally decided by the N.Y. Appellate Division in 1988. The Court's ruling in favor of Kikuchi established the notion of partial constructive eviction''; that is, a partial exclusion from the quiet use and enjoyment of the property. The rule established in this case entitled a partially constructively evicted tenant to a pro rata rent reduction in proportion to the portion of the property they were unable to use. Importantly, the court held that leaving the premises was not required under this new concept. This rule has not been widely adopted in the United States and is a minority rule. The case, 528 N.Y.S.2d 554 (App. Div. 1988), is featured in contemporary property law case books to illustrate the concept of partial constructive eviction.

References

Further reading
"Interview with Masabumi Kikuchi". Ethan Iverson's 2012 interview with Kikuchi.

External links
Discogs

Japanese jazz pianists
1939 births
2015 deaths
Musicians from Tokyo
20th-century pianists
20th-century Japanese musicians
NoBusiness Records artists